The Green Ensign is a historical flag flown by some Irish merchant vessels from before the 19th century to the early 20th century. The flag consists of a green field with a golden harp and a canton containing either the English Flag (St George's Cross) or a version of the Union Jack.

This flag has appeared in these historical flag plates:
 1685 Downham's Flag Chart
 1700 Len's Flag Chart
 1772 French 
 1783 Bowles's Universal Display of the Naval Flags of all Nations
 1799 Flags of all Nations
 1848 
 1868 Johnson's new chart of national emblems
 1889 Drawings of Flags of All Nations - British Admiralty
 1917 National Geographic Flag Book

There remains a lively debate concerning whether the flag had any form of local official status within the British Isles or was simply an informal flag used by some merchant ships.

See also

 Blue Ensign
 Red Ensign
 White Ensign
 Green harp flag

References

External links
Green Ensign at FOTW site

Civil ensigns
Ensigns by colour
Flags of Ireland
Flags of the British Empire
Flags of the United Kingdom